Insubordination Fest was an American annual punk rock music festival held in Baltimore, Maryland, that usually took place over three days, in late June.

The festival started in 2006 as a tenth-anniversary showcase for Insubordination Records, and has been held every summer since.  In the past, the festival has been headlined by bands such as Dillinger Four, Less Than Jake, The Mr. T Experience, The Queers and Teenage Bottlerocket.

Lineups by year

2006

 The Apers
 A Study in Her
 The AV Club
 Beatnik Termites
 Big In Japan
 Charlie Brown Gets a Valentine
 The Copyrights
 Delay
 The Ergs!
 Geisha Lightning
 Hot Cops
 Johnie 3
 John Stamos Project
 The Mopes
 Peabodys
 Pea Shooter
 The Proteens
 The Prozacs (band)
 Stabones
 The Steinways
 Sick Sick Birds
 Slaughterhouse 4
 The Tattle Tales
 Team Stray
 Tokyo Super Fans
 The Unlovables
 Vents
 Varsity Wierdos
 Zoinks!

2007
July 5–7, The Sidebar (Thursday) and The Ottobar (Friday and Saturday)

 The Apers
 The AV Club
 Backseat Virgins
 Banner Pilot
 Beatnik Termites
 Ben Weasel
 Big In Japan
 Chinese Telephones
 The Copyrights
 Dead Mechanical
 Dear Landlord
 Egghead
 The Ergs!
 For Science
 The Guts
 Head
 The Hi-Life
 Joe Jitzu
 Karmella's Game
 The Leftovers
 Lemuria
 The Methadones
 Modern Machines
 The Mr. T Experience
 Nancy (band)
 The Paper Dragons
 The Parasites
 Peabodys
 The Proteens
 The Prozacs
 Retarded
 The Riptides
 Short Attention
 Sick Sick Birds
 The Steinways
 The Tattle Tales
 Teenage Bottlerocket
 Team Stray
 The Unlovables
 Varsity Weirdos
 Vena Cava

 Groovie Ghoulies were originally scheduled to play but did not because of the band's break up earlier that year. Head was booked to replace them.  Members of the band did, however, appear as guests during The Mr. T Experience set. 
 Guff was also originally scheduled to play but did not.  Banner Pilot was booked to replace them. 
 The God Damn Doo Wop Band was on the final schedule, but did not play.

2008
June 26–28, The Ottobar (Thursday Pre-show), Recher Theatre (Friday) and Sonar (Saturday)

 The 20 Belows
 Agent Orange
 Ann Beretta
 The AV Club
 Backseat Virgins
 Beatnik Termites
 Be My Doppleganger
 Chinese Telephones
 Cletus
 The Copyrights
 The Crumbs
 The Drunken Cholos
 Dateless
 Dead Mechanical
 Dear Landlord
 Ded Bugs
 Deep Sleep
 Doc Hopper
 The Ergs!
 Fear of Lipstick
 Festipals
 For Science
 Full of Fancy
 The Guts
 The Hextalls
 Karmella's Game
 The Leftovers
 Lemuria
 Moral Crux
 Nancy
 Off With Their Heads
 Project 27
 Parasites
 The Proteens
 The Queers
 The Riptides
 The Steinways
 Short Attention
 Sloppy Seconds
 Sludgeworth
 Sweet Baby
 The Tattle Tales
 Teenage Rehab
 Sick Sick Birds
 Team Stray
 Weston
 Zatopeks

 Double Dagger, Clint Maul, Head Home, Sleepwall and The Swims also played at the Toxic Pop/Wallride Records showcase stage at The Talking Head Club inside Sonar.

2009
June 25–27, The Ottobar (Thursday Pre-show) and Sonar (Friday and Saturday)

 The 20 Belows
 The Adorkables
 The Apers
 The AV Club
 The Backseat Virgins
 Banner Pilot
 Be My Doppelganger
 Beatnik Termites
 Boris the Sprinkler
 The Challenged
 Charlie Brown Gets a Valentine
 The Copyrights
 The Cretins
 Dead Mechanical
 The Dead Milkmen
 Dear Landlord
 Deep Sleep
 Dillinger 4
 The Dopamines
 Egghead
 The Festipals
 The Firecrackers
 Full of Fancy
 The Gateway District
 The Guts
 The Hextalls
 House Boat
 The Jetty Boys
 John Walsh
 Karmella's Game
 Kepi Ghoulie
 The Kung Fu Monkeys
 Le Volume Était Au Maximum
 The Leftovers
 Lemuria
 The Loblaws
 The Marshmallows
 Max Levine Ensemble
 The Methadones
 One Short Fall
 Pansy Division
 Parasites
 The Proteens
 The Prozacs
 Psyched to Die
 Rational Anthem
 The Repellents
 The Resistors
 The Secretions
 The Serlingtons
 Short Attention
 The Shuttlecocks
 Sick Sick Birds
 The Sidekicks
 Spodie
 Squirtgun
 The Steinways
 Sucidie
 Teenage Bottlerocket
 Teen Idols
 Toys That Kill
 Underground Railroad to Candyland
 The Unlovables

2010
June 24–26, The Ottobar (Thursday Pre-show) and Sonar (Friday and Saturday)

 American Steel
 The Automatics
 Be My Doppelganger
 Beatnik Termites
 Black Wine
 Charlie Brown Gets a Valentine
 Chinese Telephones
 Dead Mechanical
 Dear Landlord
 Dirt Bike Annie
 The Dopamines
 The Firecrackers
 Flamingo Nosebleed
 House Boat
 Huntingtons
 Impulse International
 Jetty Boys
 Kepi Ghoulie and Friends
 Kobanes
 The Leftovers
 Less Than Jake
 Like Bats
 MC Chris
 Max Levine Ensemble
 Menzingers
 Methadones
 Nancy
 Night Birds
 Noise by Numbers
 Off with Their Heads
 Pillowfights
 Protagonist
 The Proteens
 The Prozacs
 The Quarantines
 The Queers
 Sandworms
 The Scissors
 Shutouts
 The Side Project
 The Slow Death
 Smokejumper
 Smoking Popes
 The Steinways
 Teenage Bottlerocket
 Tenement
 Varsity Weirdos
 Zatopeks

 The Creeps, Fear Of Lipstick, The Hamiltons, The Hextalls, Old Wives, The PG-13s, The Roman Line and The Visitors also played at the "Canada Invasion Presented by Merman Records" at the Sonar's second stage on Friday.
 Barrakuda McMurder, the recording project of Steinways frontman, Grath Madden, were on the bill, but only as a stand-in for a surprise reunion set by The Steinways.
 The Sidekicks were scheduled to appear for the second year in a row but cancelled the week of the festival and were replaced by Like Bats.
 The Kung Fu Monkeys were originally scheduled to play, but did not.

2011
August 11–13, The Ottobar

 Army Coach
 Be My Doppelganger
 Chixdiggit
 Connie Dungs
 The Copyrights
 Danny Vapid and the Cheats
 Dead Mechanical
 Dear Landlord
 Direct Hit
 The Dopamines
 Fatal Flaw
 The Firecrackers
 House Boat
 Iron Chic
 The Jetty Boys
 Karmella's Game
 Kepi Ghoulie
 Kurt Baker
 The Marshmallows
 Max Levine Ensemble
 Mikey Erg!
 Mixtapes
 The Murderburgers
 The Potatomen
 The Quarantines
 Shutouts
 Slow Death
 Sun Puddles
 Vacation
 Young Hasselhoffs

2012
June 21–23, The Ottobar

 Be My Doppelganger
 Beatnik Termites
 Billy Raygun
 Bobby Joe Ebola and the Children MacNuggits
 Braceface
 Candy Hearts
 City Mouse
 The Copyrights
 Dan Vapid and the Cheats
 Dead Mechanical
 Dear Landlord
 Dewtons
 Dopamines
 Dr. Frank and Friends
 Fatal Flaw
 The Firecrackers
 House Boat
 Isotopes
 Lipstick Homicide
 Mean Jeans
 Mikey Erg!
 Mixtapes
 Night Birds
 The Parasites
 Plow United
 Promdates
 Rational Anthem
 Slow Death
 Smokejumper
 Teenage Bottlerocket
 Trashkanistan
 The Unlovables
 Weekend Dads
 Weston were originally scheduled to play, but dropped off due to a band member being unable to make it.

2013
June 27–29, The Ottobar

 Beatnik Termites
 The Borderlines
 Candy Hearts
 The Capitalist Kids
 City Mouse
 The Copyrights
 Dan Vapid and the Cheats
 Dead Mechanical
 The Dewtons
 Direct Hit
 Dog Party
 Ex-Friends
 Fatal Flaw
 The Firecrackers
 Flamingo Nosebleed
 The Hellstroms
 Hospital Job
 House Boat
 Isotopes
 Jetty Boys
 Kepi Ghoulie
 Kepi-rights (Kepi Ghoulie with The Copyrights as a backing band)
 Lipstick Homicide
 The Marshmallows
 The Meeps
 Mikey Erg!
 The Mopes
 Night Birds
 Paper Dragons
 Plow United
 The Quarantines
 Rational Antheim
 Schroeder and the Brillo Pad
 Screaming Females
 Sick Sick Birds
 Slow Death
 The Steinways
 Team Stray
 Tight Bros.
 Tonight We Strike
 Trashkanistan

CD/DVDs
During 2007, a live CD/DVD was released compiling various performances from that year's festival. Additionally CD/DVD sets were released compiling the entirety of some bands' set that year including The AV Club, Dead Mechanical, The Guts, The Leftovers, Paper Dragons, Short Attention, The Steinways, Varsity Weirdos and Wimpy Rutherford.

See also

 Culture of Baltimore
List of punk rock festivals
List of historic rock festivals

References

2006 establishments in Maryland
Annual events in Maryland
Festivals in Baltimore
Music festivals in Maryland
Punk rock festivals
Recurring events established in 2006
Rock festivals in the United States
Summer festivals
Tourist attractions in Baltimore